João Joaquim Marques da Silva Oliveira (23 August 1853 – 9 October 1927) was a Portuguese painter in the Naturalist style.

Biography
Oliveira was born in Porto. Five years later, he enrolled in the history painting course taught by João António Correia and graduated in 1873. For the next six years, he lived in France with his colleague António da Silva Porto while they studied at the École des Beaux-arts under Alexandre Cabanel and Adolphe Yvon. While living there, they also made study trips to Belgium, England, the Netherlands and Italy. The sketches and paintings that resulted from these trips led to his participation in the Salons of 1876 and 1878.

Upon his return to Porto in 1879, he worked as a free-lance artist and helped introduce the concept of plein-air painting in Portugal. The following year, he became Vice-President of the Centro Artístico Portuense, an association for the advancement of the arts modeled on the "" of Lisbon. From 1881 to 1926, he was a professor at the Academy in Porto and later held the position of Director.
Some of his pupils were Aurélia de Sousa and Lino António.

In 1911, he was appointed Chairman of the Board and a member of the Executive Committee for Art at the newly reorganized Soares dos Reis National Museum. In 1913, he became the Director. He reluctantly resigned all of his positions in 1926, when he reached the mandatory retirement age for public employees, and died the following year in his home city of Porto.

References

Further reading
 José Augusto França: A Arte em Portugal no Século XIX, Livraria Bertrand, 1990. .

External links
 ArtNet: more works by Oliveira
 João Marques de Oliveira @ the Museo Nacional de Soares dos Reis

1853 births
1927 deaths
University of Porto alumni
Artists from Porto
19th-century Portuguese painters
Portuguese male painters
19th-century male artists
20th-century Portuguese painters
20th-century male artists